The Nechisar nightjar (Caprimulgus solala) is a species of nightjar in the family Caprimulgidae. It is endemic to Ethiopia.

The species was first discovered in 1990 when researchers discovered a decomposing specimen in the Nechisar National Park. After bringing back a single wing from the specimen to the Natural History Museum in London, it was determined to be a previously unknown species. Its specific name, solala, means "only a wing".

Its natural habitat is subtropical. It is probably endemic to Nechisar NP.

References

External links
BirdLife Species Factsheet.

Caprimulgus
Endemic birds of Ethiopia
Birds described in 1995
Taxonomy articles created by Polbot
Species known from a single specimen